Wheeleria obsoletus is a moth of the family Pterophoridae. It is found in France, Italy, Austria, Sardinia, Sicily, the Czech Republic, Slovakia, Hungary, Croatia, Bosnia and Herzegovina, North Macedonia, Greece, Bulgaria, Romania, Ukraine, Belarus, Russia, Cyprus, Turkmenistan, Asia Minor and western Asia.

Adults are on wing from April (the Palestinian Territories) or the end of May (Europe) to August in one generation per year.

The larvae feed on black horehound (Ballota nigra), common horehound (Marrubium vulgare) and horehound (Marrubium peregrinum).

References

External links
lepiforum.de

Moths described in 1841
Pterophorini
Moths of Asia
Plume moths of Asia
Plume moths of Europe
Taxa named by Philipp Christoph Zeller